Arcade is a ballet made by John Taras to Igor Stravinsky's Concerto for Piano and Winds (1924). The premiere took place Thursday, March 28, 1963, at the New York State Theater, Lincoln Center.

Original Cast 

  
Suzanne Farrell

Arthur Mitchell

Articles 
Sunday NY Times, April 7, 1963

obituaries 
NY Times of John Taras by Anna Kisselgoff, April 5, 2004
Ballets by John Taras
Ballets to the music of Igor Stravinsky
1963 ballet premieres
New York City Ballet repertory